Justin Todd Richards (born March 17, 1998) is an American professional ice hockey forward currently playing for the Cleveland Monsters of the American Hockey League (AHL) while under contract to the Columbus Blue Jackets of the National Hockey League (NHL).

Playing career
Richards played college ice hockey at the University of Minnesota-Duluth. On April 2, 2020, Richards signed a two-year, entry-level contract with the New York Rangers of the National Hockey League (NHL). He spent the majority of the 2020–21 season with Hartford Wolf Pack of the American Hockey League (AHL), the Rangers' AHL affiliate. Richards made his NHL debut for the Rangers on May 8, 2021, against the Boston Bruins. Richards recorded his first NHL point in that game assisting on a goal by K'Andre Miller.

As a free agent from the Rangers following the  season, Richards continued his professional career in the AHL, signing a one-year deal with the Cleveland Monsters, the primary affiliate of the Columbus Blue Jackets, on 29 August 2022. In the  season, Richards emerged as an offensive leader with the Monsters, collecting 17 points through his first 23 games. He was signed to a one-year, two-way contract with the Columbus Blue Jackets on December 19, 2022.

Personal life
Richards is the son of former ice hockey player, Todd Richards, and is the nephew of Travis Richards.

Career statistics

References

External links
 

1998 births
Living people
American men's ice hockey forwards
Cleveland Monsters players
Hartford Wolf Pack players
Lincoln Stars players
Minnesota Duluth Bulldogs men's ice hockey players
New York Rangers players
University of Minnesota Duluth alumni
Undrafted National Hockey League players